Sainte-Luce is a municipality in the La Mitis Regional County Municipality in the Bas-Saint-Laurent region of Quebec, Canada.  The population in the Canada 2021 Census was 2,845.

History 
The territory was known as of 1829 as the parish of Sainte-Luce, which was established in 1835. It became a municipality in 1855, but this same municipality had been created 1845 under the name of Lessard, for the name of the seigneurie which existed during the 16th century.

The name of Sainte-Luce was given in honour of Luce-Gertrude Drapeau (1794–1880), wife of the local notary, Thomas Casault, one the persons that established the seigneurie when the parish was canonized. The patron saint was Saint Lucy.

In 1918, the municipality of the village of Luceville was created from the territory of Sainte-Luce. Because it had one of the nicest beaches in the area, it had the nickname of Sainte-Luce-sur-Mer. The name of Luceville now identifies with the former municipality of the same name.

On August 29, 2001 the village of Luceville merged with the parish municipality of Sainte-Luce to form the municipality of Sainte-Luce–Luceville; the name was changed to simply Sainte-Luce on April 27, 2002.

See also
 List of municipalities in Quebec

References

External links
 
 Official website

Municipalities in Quebec
Incorporated places in Bas-Saint-Laurent
1835 establishments in Canada